The Imperial National Wildlife Refuge protects wildlife habitat along  of the lower Colorado River in Arizona and California, including the last un-channeled section before the river enters Mexico. The Imperial Refuge Wilderness, a federally designated, wilderness area is protected within the refuge.  It also surrounds the Picacho State Recreation Area.  This section of the Colorado River is popular for boating, hiking, fishing, camping, exploring old mining camps and wildlife watching.

The river and its associated backwater lakes and wetlands are a green oasis, contrasting with the surrounding desert mountains. It is a refuge and breeding area for migratory birds and local desert wildlife.

Wildlife
Even though it is located in the Sonoran Desert, the Imperial National Wildlife Refuge  is home to a mostly wetland environment. Wetland wildlife is most abundant in winter, when birds such as cinnamon teal and northern pintail use the refuge. During the summer months, permanent residents such as great egrets are abundant. The Colorado River plays a vital role in the lives of desert fauna. It is the only water source for many miles. Small animals such as the black-tailed jackrabbit and western whiptail lizard are plentiful. Desert bighorn sheep and mule deer also call the refuge home.

Birds

Common loon                                                                 
 Western grebe
 Blue-footed booby
 Brown booby
 American white pelican
 Brown pelican
 Double-crested cormorant
 Great blue heron
 Great egret
 Snowy egret
 Wood stork
 Canada goose
 Wood duck
 Mallard
 Northern pintail
 Cinnamon teal
 Turkey vulture
 Osprey
 Bald eagle
 Red-tailed hawk
 American kestrel
 Peregrine falcon
 Gambel's quail
 Sandhill crane
 Killdeer
 California gull
 Common tern
 Mourning dove
 Common ground-dove
 Yellow-billed cuckoo
 Greater roadrunner
 Barn owl
 Great horned owl
 Burrowing owl
 White-throated swift
 Hummingbird
 Belted kingfisher
 Gila woodpecker
 Tree swallow
 Barn swallow
 Woodhouse's scrub jay
 Common raven
 Brown creeper
 Cactus wren
 Marsh wren
 Northern mockingbird
 House finch

A full list of birds found on the refuge can be found on the refuge website.

Forest in the Desert
At one time, the banks of the Colorado River were lined with cottonwood and willow forests, sustained by the river’s natural periodic flooding. Animals depended on this green forest oasis for breeding, resting, feeding, and shade. Woodcutting during the steamboat era, clearing for agriculture, wild fire, exotic plants like salt cedar, and use of dams for flood prevention have devastated cottonwood and willow stands along the lower Colorado River. Some animals that depended on the riparian forests, such as the southwestern willow flycatcher (Empidonax traillii extimus), have become endangered.

Trails
The Painted Desert Trail, a National Recreation Trail, is a 1.3-mile self-guided trail for an opportunity to see desert plants and wildlife. The trail takes you through a rainbow of colors left by 30,000-year-old volcanic activity and features a panoramic view of the Colorado River valley.

See also
 Colorado River
 Colorado Desert
 Yuma Desert
 Lower Colorado River Valley
 Sonny Bono Salton Sea National Wildlife Refuge

References

External links
 

National Wildlife Refuges in Arizona
National Wildlife Refuges in California
Protected areas established in 1941
Protected areas of Imperial County, California
Protected areas of La Paz County, Arizona
Protected areas of Yuma County, Arizona
Protected areas of the Colorado Desert
Protected areas of the Sonoran Desert
Protected areas on the Colorado River
Wilderness areas within the Lower Colorado River Valley
Yuma Desert
Wetlands of Arizona
Landforms of Imperial County, California
Landforms of La Paz County, Arizona
Landforms of Yuma County, Arizona
Wetlands of California
1941 establishments in Arizona
1941 establishments in California